'Ala' al-Din al-Kasani, known as Al-Kasani or al-Kashani, was a 12th Century Sunni Muslim Jurist who became an influential figure of the Hanafi school of Sunni jurisprudence, which has remained the most widely practiced law school in the Sunni tradition.

He was nicknamed Malik al-'Ulama' ("King of the Scholars"). His major work entitled Bada'i' al-Sana'i' fi Tartib al-Shara'i' is one of the most important Islamic legal manuals of the Hanafi tradition.

Life

Early life and marriage 
Al-Kāsānī came from the place of Kāsān (Kasansay, Kosonsoy) in the Ferghana and was a student of the Hanafi legal scholar 'Ala' al-Din al-Samarqandi (died 1144), who gave him his daughter Fatima al-Samarqandi, who was trained in fiqh, as a wife. As a bridal gift he was to gift her a commentary on the legal compendium of her father, Tuḥfat al-fuqahā. The book, Bada'i As-Sana'i, was accepted as a dowry.

Career 
At an unknown date, he emigrated to Asia Minor, where he worked at the court of the Rum-Seljuk Turks in Konya. Here he made an argument with another Jurist, in which he appeared so violent that the ruler Mas'ud I considered it impossible to keep him at the court. The topic of the debate was Ijtihad. His opponent accused al-Kāsānī of representing Mu'tazilite teachings. When al-Kāsānī punched his opponent, the ruler intervened and ended the discussion.

Since al-Kāsānī had made himself impossible by his behavior at the court, the ruler sent him on the advice of his vizier as ambassador to Nur ad-Din Zengi at Aleppo. Here he was appointed as successor of Radī ad-Dīn as-Sarachsī (died 1149) professor of Hanafi law at the Madrasa Hallāwīya.

Later life and death 
Not much is known about his remaining life. Ali al-Qari reports that he was deeply attached to his wife Fātima. Whenever he had any doubts and erred in issuing a fatwa, she would inform him the correct judgment and explain the reason for the mistake. Although al-Kasani was a competent jurist, Fatima corrected and edited his legal opinions. He visited her grave at the Abraham Sanctuary in the citadel of Aleppo every Thursday evening after her death. After his death in 1191 he was buried beside her.

Teachers 
He studied under prominent scholars, such as Abu al-Mu'in al-Nasafi, and 'Ala' al-Din al-Samarqandi.

Students 
Among his pupils was Jamal al-Din al-Ghaznawi.

Works 
Al-Kasani's main work is his handbook Bada'i' al-Sana'i' fi Tartib al-Shara'i', which occupies seven volumes in the modern print edition. It is said to be the commentary al-Kāsānī wrote to the handbook of his teacher, as-Samarqandī, but it does not have the character of a commentary, but rather a strictly systematic account of the various legal domains. Al-Kāsānī begins each chapter with an outline in which he explains which subjects he intends to deal with. However, despite its methodological clarity, the work had no major impact on the development of Hanafi law for a certain period of time. In contrast to the "Al-Hidayah" of his contemporary al-Marghinānī it has never been commented on. Only the appearance of the modern print edition in the early 20th century has given the work greater attention. Since then, it has been of central importance in the Hanafi Academic Institutions.

In addition to the  Badā'i  al-Kāsānī has also written a Qur'an commentary, preserved as a manuscript.

See also 
 List of Hanafis
 List of Ash'aris and Maturidis

References

Hanafis
Maturidis
12th-century Muslim theologians
Sunni imams
Sunni Muslim scholars of Islam
Hanafi fiqh scholars
Uzbekistani Muslims
1191 deaths